Canoparmelia albomaculata is a species of lichen in the family Parmeliaceae. This species is very similar to the apostulate Canoparmelia caroliniana, showing the same colour, size and reticulate maculae. C. caroliniana, however, has true isidia. Big coralloid pustules that in some cases become sorediate are a characteristic feature for C. albomaculata.

Description
Its surface is smooth and irregularly cracked. The species' ramification is irregularly dichotomous, with rounded apices, an oval axillary sinus, and a black-lined margin with no cilia. It shows no lacinules while possessing laminal maculae.

Its pustulae are found as marginal and submarginal, its coralloid being isidioid, at times exhibiting granular soredia apically. Its medulla is white, while its underside possesses a rugose and veined light brown center, as well as a rugose, veined and papillate margin. Apothecia and pycnidia are absent in Canoparmelia albomaculata.

Habitat

References

Further reading
Spielmann, Adriano Afonso, and Marcelo Pinto Marcelli. "Parmeliaceae (Ascomycota liquenizados) nos barrancos e peraus da encosta da Serra Geral, Vale do Rio Pardo, Rio Grande do Sul, Brasil. II. Gêneros Canoparmelia, Hypotrachyna, Myelochroa, Parmelinopsis e Relicina." Iheringia, Série Botânica63.2 (2008): 193–212.

Parmeliaceae
Lichen species
Lichens of South America
Lichens described in 2002
Taxa named by Klaus Kalb